Dias Omirzakov (born ) is a Kazakhstani cyclist. He won the silver medal in the individual pursuit at the 2016 Asian Cycling Championships.

Major results

Road
2011
 6th Overall Tour of Thailand
1st Stage 5
2012
 1st Stage 4 Tour of Vietnam
2014
 1st Stage 7 Tour of Guiana

Track
2012
 3rd  Team pursuit, Asian Track Championships
2013
 2nd  Individual pursuit, Asian Track Championships
2015
 1st  Madison, National Track Championships (with Sultanmurat Miraliyev)
2016
 1st  Madison, National Track Championships (with Sultanmurat Miraliyev)
 2nd  Individual pursuit, Asian Track Championships

References

External links
 

1992 births
Living people
Kazakhstani track cyclists
Kazakhstani male cyclists
People from Shymkent
Cyclists at the 2014 Asian Games
Asian Games competitors for Kazakhstan
20th-century Kazakhstani people
21st-century Kazakhstani people